Pilar García may refer to:

 Pilar García (brigadier general) (1896-unknown), Cuban Brigadier General and police chief
 Pilar García Negro (born 1953), Spanish politician and sociolinguist
 Pilar García Muñiz (born 1974), Spanish journalist
 Pilar García (footballer) (born 1990), Spanish footballer